Peter C. W. Hoffmann  (13 August 1930 – 6 January 2023) was a German-Canadian historian who was the William Kingsford Professor in the Department of History at McGill University. His principal area of research dealt with the German resistance against Nazism, and in particular, the resistance efforts of Claus von Stauffenberg. Hoffmann lived in Canada and in Germany.

Life 
Hoffmann was born in Dresden, Germany, on 13 August 1930 and grew up in Stuttgart. After studying at the universities of Stuttgart, Tübingen, Zurich, Northwestern University and Munich he received his doctorate in 1961 from Franz Schnabel following his thesis defence on The diplomatic relations between Wurtemberg and Bavaria from the Crimean War and the beginning of the Italian Crisis (Die diplomatischen Beziehungen zwischen Württemberg und Bayern im Krimkrieg und bis zum Beginn der Italienischen Krise). In 1965 he became a postdoctorate at the University of Northern Iowa. In 1970 he took up a teaching position on German History at McGill University in Montreal. Hoffmann was the William Kingsford Professor of History at McGill and a fellow of the Royal Society of Canada.

Works 
 Widerstand, Staatsstreich, Attentat - Der Kampf der Opposition gegen Hitler. 4. new reworked and expanded edition. Piper, München 1985. .
 German Resistance to Hitler. Harvard University Press, Cambridge, Massachusetts 1989. .
 Stauffenberg und der 20. Juli 1944. Beck, Munich 1998. .
 Hitler's Personal Security. Da Capo Press, Boston 2000 [1979]. .
 Stauffenbergs Freund. Die tragische Geschichte des Widerstandskämpfers Joachim Kuhn. C. H. Beck, Munich 2007. .
 Claus Schenk Graf von Stauffenberg. Die Biographie. Fourth, expanded edition. Pantheon, Munich 2009. .
 Carl Goerdeler and the Jewish Question, 1933–1942. Cambridge University Press, Cambridge 2011. .
 Behind Valkyrie. German Resistance to Hitler. Documents. McGill-Queen's University Press, Montreal & Kingston, London, Ithaca 2011. .
 Carl Goerdeler gegen die Verfolgung der Juden. Böhlau Verlag, Cologne, Weimar, Vienna 2013. .

Literature 
 T. Lahme: Ein Leben im Widerstand. Zum 80. Geburtstag von Peter Hoffmann. In: FAZ, 9. August 2010, S. 28.

References

External links 
 
 Website with publications by Peter Hoffmann the McGill University server

1930 births
2023 deaths
20th-century Canadian historians
Academic staff of McGill University
Fellows of the Royal Society of Canada
German emigrants to Canada
Writers from Dresden
Officers Crosses of the Order of Merit of the Federal Republic of Germany
21st-century Canadian historians
20th-century German historians